In mathematics, in algebra, in the realm of group theory, a subgroup  of a finite group  is said to be semipermutable if  commutes with every subgroup  whose order is relatively prime to that of .

Clearly, every permutable subgroup of a finite group is semipermutable. The converse, however, is not necessarily true.

External links
 The Influence of semipermutable subgroups on the structure of finite groups

Subgroup properties